Lazer may refer to:

 An incorrect spelling of laser, an acronym for Light Amplification by Stimulated Emission of Radiation
 An antiquated term for a person with leprosy.
 Lazer, Hautes-Alpes, a commune in southeastern France
 Panther Lazer, a car
 Lazer 103, a Wisconsin radio station
 Lazer 99.3, a Massachusetts radio station
 Lazer Team, a 2015 feature film by Rooster Teeth Productions
 Major Lazer, an electronic dance music trio

See also 
 Laser (disambiguation)
 Laze (disambiguation)